Palmer Road is a small community located in Lot 1, in Prince County, Prince Edward Island, Canada that is located on Route 155, Route 156 and Route 158. There are approximately 100 citizens in Palmer Road, and it is located between Tignish and St. Louis, Prince Edward Island. It is also home to the Immaculate Conception Church, and the nearby Palmer Road Community Center.

List of roads in Palmer Road
Palmer Rd - Hwy 156
DeBlois Rd - Hwy 157
Hwy 158
Thompson Rd - Hwy 155
Church View Rd
Provost Rd
Knox Ln

Communities in Prince County, Prince Edward Island